The Negara River ( or ) is a river of Borneo, Indonesia. It flows in the southeast region of the island, within the Negara District, province of South Kalimantan. It is the second longest river in the province after the Barito River, which the Negara River flows into.

Hydrology 
This river is a tributary of the Barito River. It rises in the Meratus Mountains, Tabalong Regency. The river mouth is located in the border of Tapin Regency and Barito Kuala Regency, where the small city of Marabahan (historic name: Bandar Muara Bahan) is located.

The Negara River has become the source of life for the people of South Kalimantan, especially in the northern region, both for the source of water and for transportation. Locations of interest along the Negara River include Margasari in Tapin Regency and Negara District in Hulu Sungai Selatan Regency.

Etymology 
The river name is taken from the Negara District (formerly the center of Negara Daha Kingdom). During the Negara Daha (pre-Islamic) period, the river was called Sungai Bahan (Bahan River). The watershed of Negara is called Batang Banyu area.

Geography 
The river flows in the southeast area of Borneo island with predominantly tropical rainforest climate (designated as Af in the Köppen-Geiger climate classification). The wettest month is February, with an average of  rainfall, and the driest is September, with a  rainfall.

Landscape 

This area can be reached using the road connecting Banjarmasin and Balikpapan, through Kandangan and Amuntai. With an area of around 250,000 hectares, this valley is one of the most fertile in Borneo (Kalimantan), resulting in a higher population than in other parts of Kalimantan. "Rawa Negara" ("Negara Swamp") is located between the Barito River and Meratus Mountains, with open surface and deep water, stretching to the lakes area (Lake Bangkau, Lake Panggang and Lake Sembujur) forming a plain with seasonal flood and protecting the downstream area from flood or salt-water intrusion. The local people are mostly of the Banjar ethnic group, who have an interesting land use system that combines various rice types which grow on the surface (floating), water buffalo and duck husbandry. The main habitat is the peat swamp forest, riparian forest, Melaleuca/Combretocarpus swamp forest, various open swamp with floating vegetation or grassy swamp, open water body and agricultural land. The people uses this area to find wood, cut trees to make furniture, create farm lands, and engage in fishery and bird hunting.

See also
List of rivers of Indonesia
List of rivers of Kalimantan

References

Rivers of South Kalimantan
Rivers of Indonesia